Daniel Kleppner, born 1932, is the Lester Wolfe Professor Emeritus of Physics at MIT and co-director of the MIT-Harvard Center for Ultracold Atoms. His areas of science include Atomic, Molecular, and Optical Physics, and his research interests include Experimental Atomic Physics, Laser Spectroscopy, and High Precision Measurements. He is the winner of the 2005 Wolf Prize in Physics, the 2007 Frederic Ives Medal, and the 2014 Benjamin Franklin Medal. Prof. Kleppner has also been awarded the National Medal of Science (2006). He was elected the American Academy of Arts and Sciences in 1986, the French Academy of Sciences in 2004, and the American Philosophical Society in 2007. Together with Robert J. Kolenkow, he authored a popular introductory mechanics textbook for advanced students.  Kleppner graduated from Williams College with a B.A. in 1953, Cambridge University with a B.A. in 1955, and Harvard University with a Ph.D. in 1959.

Biography

Parents

Kleppner's father was Otto Kleppner, founder of an advertising agency.

Education and career

Kleppner graduated from Williams College in 1953 in Williamstown, Massachusetts. He also attended Cambridge University in Cambridge, England, and Harvard University in Cambridge, Massachusetts, where he attended the Harvard Graduate School of Arts and Sciences.

In the 1950s, Kleppner became a physics doctoral student at Harvard University, where he worked under Norman Ramsey.
Here, Kleppner took the concepts behind an ammonia maser and applied them to a hydrogen maser, which became his Ph.D. thesis.
Kleppner did important research into Rydberg atoms.
Later he became interested in creating a Hydrogen Bose-Einstein Condensate (BEC).
In 1995, a group of researchers, including Kleppner's former students, made a BEC using Rubidium atoms.
It was not until 1998 that Kleppner and Tom Greytak finally created a Hydrogen BEC.

Books 
Kleppner and Robert J. Kolenkow wrote An Introduction to Mechanics in 1973. 40 years later, Kleppner and Kolenkow returned to edit and publish a second edition in 2013.

Selected publications

References

External links 
Faculty page at MIT
Interview with Daniel Kleppner (Video)

1932 births
Living people
Harvard University alumni
21st-century American physicists
Williams College alumni
Optical physicists
Wolf Prize in Physics laureates
Massachusetts Institute of Technology School of Science faculty
National Medal of Science laureates
Members of the French Academy of Sciences
Members of the United States National Academy of Sciences
Fellows of the American Physical Society
Members of the American Philosophical Society